Heinz Döpfl (30 January 1939 – 11 August 1998) was an Austrian pair skater. Competing with Diana Hinko, he became a three-time national champion (1959–1961). The pair finished eighth at the 1960 Winter Olympics and fifth at the 1961 European Championships.

Döpfl also competed in men's singles, winning two national bronze medals.

Results

Pairs with Hinko

Men's singles

References

Navigation

Austrian male pair skaters
Olympic figure skaters of Austria
Figure skaters at the 1960 Winter Olympics
1939 births
1998 deaths